Engine Takes to the Water is the debut studio album by Louisville-based math rock band June of 44, released on June 20, 1995, by Quarterstick Records.

Track listing

Credits
Adapted from the Engine Takes to the Water liner notes.

June of 44
 Fred Erskine – bass guitar
 Sean Meadows – electric guitar, vocals
 Jeff Mueller – electric guitar, vocals
 Doug Scharin – drums

Production and additional personnel
 James Murphy – recording

Release history

References

External links 
 

1995 debut albums
June of 44 albums
Quarterstick Records albums